Shur Qazi (also Romanized as Shūr Qāẕī; also known as Shūr) is a village in Eyvanki Rural District, Eyvanki District, Garmsar County, Semnan Province, Iran. At the 2006 census, its population was 224, in 60 families.

References 

Populated places in Garmsar County